The Men's scratch at the 2012 UCI Track Cycling World Championships was held on April 4. Twenty-one athletes participated in the scratch race. The competition consisted of 60 laps, making a total of 15 km.

Medalists

Results
The race was held at 20:35.

References

2012 UCI Track Cycling World Championships
UCI Track Cycling World Championships – Men's scratch